Mahadevappa Rampure Medical College (MRMC) is a semi-government medical college in Gulbarga, Karnataka, India. The college is affiliated to Rajiv Gandhi University of Health Sciences, Bangalore.

History
Hyderabad Karnataka Education Society established MRMC in 1963, and opened Basaveshwar Teaching and General Hospital in January 1967. The college received recognition from the Medical Council of India in 1972.

Curing clubfoot
Recognizing that clubfoot can result in permanent disability despite being easily detected and inexpensively cured, the college teamed up with CURE International India Trust to begin offering free treatment for clubfoot in 2011. Using the Ponseti method, the college's CURE Clubfoot Clinic treated 80 children in the first year.

Teaching Hospital
The clinical training was initially at the present District General Hospital in Gulbarga. From 2005, all clinical teaching activity was moved to hospitals operated by the college, Basaveshwara Teaching and General Hospital, Gulbarga and Sangameshwar Teaching Hospital to satisfy Medical Council of India requirements.

Departments

Anatomy 
Physiology 
Biochemistry
Pharmacology 
Pathology
Microbiology 
Forensic Medicine 
Community Medicine 
General Medicine 
Psychiatry 
Tuberculosis & Chest Diseases 
Skin & Venereal Disease 
General Surgery 
Orthopaedics 
Ophthalmology 
Ear, Nose & Throat 
Radiology
Anaesthesiology 
Paediatrics 
Obstetrics & Gynecology

Notable alumni 
 Dr. Y.S. Raja Sekhara Reddy, Former Chief Minister of Andhra Pradesh. 
 Dr Sharanprakash Patil , Former Minister  
 Dr Chandrasekhar Patil , MLC  
 Dr Neeraj Patil , Former Mayor of Lambeth 
 Dr Sharan Patil , Chairman Sparsh Groups Of Hospital

References
 

Medical Council of India
Medical colleges in Karnataka
Education in Kalaburagi
Companies based in Kalaburagi
Universities and colleges in Kalaburagi district
1963 establishments in Mysore State